Siswondo Parman (4 August 1918 – 1 October 1965) or more popularly known such as in streets name as S. Parman, was a soldier in the Indonesian Army, and was kidnapped from his home in Jakarta by members of the 30 September Movement in the early hours of October 1. He was later killed at Lubang Buaya.

Early life
Parman was born in Wonosobo, Central Java. He graduated from the town's Dutch high school in 1940 and entered medical school, but had to leave when the Japanese invaded. He then worked for the Japanese Kempeitai military police. However, he was arrested because of doubts over his loyalty, but was later freed. Following his release, he was sent to Japan for intelligence training, and worked again for the Kempeitai on his return until the end of the war, working as a translator in Yogyakarta.

Career with the Indonesian Military
After the Indonesian Declaration of Independence, Parman joined the People's Security Forces (TKR), the forerunner of the Indonesian National Armed Forces, and joined the military police. At the end of December 1945, he was appointed chief of staff of the Military Police in Yogyakarta. Four years later he became chief of staff to the Greater Jakarta Military Governor and was promoted to major, managing to foil a coup by the Legion of Ratu Adil (APRA), a pro-Dutch militia group led by Raymond Westerling.

In 1951, Parman was sent to the Military Police School in the United States for further training, and on November 11 that year, was appointed commander of the Jakarta Military Police. He then occupied a number of positions at National Military Police HQ and became Provost Commandant of the Military Police Corps from 1950 to 1952, and was later assigned to the Indonesian Defense Ministry before being sent to London as military attache to the Indonesian Embassy there. On June 28, he was appointed First Assistant Chief of Staff with responsibility for intelligence to the Chief of Staff of the Army, Lieutenant General Ahmad Yani.

Death
Parman was one of six army generals killed by members of the 30 September Movement on the night of 30 September 1965. He had been warned several days before of  a possible Communist move. On the night of 30 September, there were no guards watching over the house.

According to Parman's wife, the couple were woken from their sleep at about 4.10 in the morning by the noise of people at the side of the house. Parman went to investigate and twenty-four men in the uniform of the Tjakrabirawa (Presidential Guard) burst into the living room. The men told him he was to appear before the President as "something interesting had happened". About 10 men went into his bedroom while Parman got dressed. His wife was more suspicious of the men, and questioned whether they had an authorising letter, to which one of the men replied he had a letter while tapping his chest pocket.

Parman asked his wife to report what had happened to his commander, Yani, but the telephone wires had been cut. Parman was put into a truck and taken to the movement's base at Lubang Buaya. Later that night, along with the other 2 generals and 1 first officer who had been taken alive, Parman was shot dead and his body dumped in a disused well.

The bodies of all the victims were recovered on October 4 and the men were given a state funeral the next day, the Armed Forces Day. The bodies were recovered and all were given a state funeral on October 5, before being buried at the Heroes Cemetery, Kalibata. On the same day, via Presidential Decision No. 111/KOTI/1965, President Sukarno formally made Parman a Hero of the Revolution.

References

 Bachtiar, Harsja W. (1988), Siapa Dia?: Perwira Tinggi Tentara Nasional Indonesia Angkatan Darat (Who is S/He?: Senior Officers of the Indonesian Army), Penerbit Djambatan, Jakarta, 
 
 Mutiara Sumber Widya (publisher)(1999) Album Pahlawan Bangsa (Album of National Heroes), Jakarta
 Secretariat Negara Republik Indonesia (1994) Gerakan 30 September Pemberontakan Partai Komunis Indonesia: Latar Belakang, Aksi dan Penumpasannya (The 30 September Movement/Communist Party of Indonesia: Bankground, Actions and its Annihilation) 
 Sudarmanto, Y.B. (1996) Jejak-Jejak Pahlawan dari Sultan Agung hingga Syekh Yusuf (The Footsteps of Heroes from Sultan Agung to Syekh Yusuf), Penerbit Grasindo, Jakarta 

1918 births
1965 deaths
Indonesian collaborators with Imperial Japan
Indonesian generals
National Heroes of Indonesia
People from Wonosobo Regency